Alessia Aureli (born 17 June 1984) is an Italian former ice dancer. With Andrea Vaturi, she won three medals on the ISU Junior Grand Prix series and finished in the top ten at the 2002 and 2003 World Junior Championships.

Career 
From 2001 through 2006, Aureli competed with Andrea Vaturi. They are the 2004 and 2005 Italian silver medalists and 2006 bronze medalists.

In the 2007–2008 season, Aureli competed with Marco Garavaglia. Together, they are the 2008 Italian bronze medalists. Their partnership ended following that season.

Programs 
(with Vaturi)

Results

With Garavaglia

With Vaturi

References

External links 
 
 

Italian female ice dancers
Sportspeople from Rome
1984 births
Living people
20th-century Italian women
21st-century Italian women